The Lake Eacham rainbowfish (Melanotaenia eachamensis) is a species of rainbowfish in the subfamily Melanotaeniidae which was thought to be endemic to Yidyam (Lake Eacham), Queensland, Australia but has proven to have a wider range.

Conservation
The species was thought to be extinct due to predation from native fishes — including the Barred Grunter (Amniataba percoides) and Mouth Almighty (Glossamia aprion) — illegally translocated to Lake Eacham in the 1980s. The species was rediscovered in the private collections of aquarists and has also been found to have a wider distribution in the Barron and Johnstone River systems.

It is listed as Endangered on the IUCN Red List and on the EPBC Act 1999.

This species is found in small creeks and crater lakes, congregating along the shallow margins among aquatic vegetation, fallen logs or branches.

References

 Allen, Gerald R.; & Cross, Norbert J. (1982). Rainbowfishes of Australia and Papua New Guinea. Angus & Robertson, Australia. 

Lake Eacham rainbowfish
Freshwater fish of Queensland
Far North Queensland
Vulnerable fauna of Australia
Taxonomy articles created by Polbot
Taxa named by Gerald R. Allen
Taxa named by Norbert J. Cross
Lake Eacham rainbowfish